Tripwire is the third book in the Jack Reacher series written by Lee Child. It was published in 1999 by Putnam in America and Bantam in the United Kingdom. It is written in the third person. In the novel, retired military police officer Jack Reacher becomes embroiled in a mystery involving a Vietnam War veteran who was reported missing in action, but who has resurfaced as a vicious loanshark with a secret he will murder to protect.

Plot summary
The prologue describes Victor Truman "Hook" Hobie's carefully planned escape route in the event of somebody discovering his "really big, well-guarded secret". His "early-warning system" consists of geographically-located "tripwires" that will warn him that he has been discovered. The first is eleven thousand miles from his home in the United States and the second is six thousand miles out. His response to their activation would be to tie up loose ends, cash in, transfer his assets, and flee the country. Over thirty years of quiet success have made him feel somewhat secure. But he did not expect both alerts to arrive on the same day.

The story then begins with Jack Reacher working two jobs in Key West (digging pools with a shovel by day and working in a bar at night) and bumping into a private investigator, Costello, who happens to be looking for him on behalf of a client named Mrs. Jacob, a name Reacher does not recognise. Later on, while Reacher is working his night job as a bouncer in a strip club, two suspicious-looking large men also make inquiries about his location. Reacher attempts to follow them but instead finds Costello murdered on the sidewalk. Jack then flies to New York to find out why Costello was looking for him and why he was killed for it.

After finding Costello's office seemingly untouched, Reacher's suspicion is aroused by an unsaved document open on the secretary's computer. Searching through the files on the computer Reacher gets the contact information for Mrs. Jacob and arrives in the middle of a funeral for his old mentor, former commanding officer, and friend, General Leon Garber. Garber's now-adult daughter, Jodie Garber-Jacob, turns out to be the mystery client. She has become a successful lawyer.

Reacher and Jodie follow Costello's trail, uncovering information on her father's last project, an investigation for the Hobie family on the whereabouts of their son Victor, a helicopter pilot reported missing-in-action decades ago in Vietnam. They discover that the Hobies had been tricked into giving their life savings to a con man and gun runner named Rutter, who poses as a fake military liaison and investigator to families of MIA soldiers. Hobie becomes aware of their investigation, and tries to hunt them down. After forcing Rutter to return the money he stole, Reacher and Jodie visit the National Personnel Records Center in St. Louis, which leads them to the military Central Identification Laboratory in Hawaii, a special facility that identifies the forensic remains of soldiers. 

They then learn that Hobie served in the war as a helicopter pilot until he was shot down. However, it becomes clear that Hobie died in the crash, and that another soldier named Carl Allen assumed his identity in order to escape prosecution for fragging a superior officer. Severely burned by the crash, Allen left his own dogtags behind to fool investigators and had his right hand, lost in the helicopter crash, replaced with a hook.

Under his new identity, Allen amasses a fortune as an illicit "moneylender", before establishing himself as a legitimate businessman who offers high-interest loans to financially troubled firms unable to borrow from banks. However, his real objective is to seize control of their assets, using threats and torture to force his clients to agree to his terms. Despite being aware that Reacher's investigation could expose his crimes, Allen decides to complete one final job: the takeover of a bankrupt multimillion-dollar company owned by Chester and Marilyn Stone. Allen and his men take the couple hostage, but Marilyn is able to stall them before her husband signs over his company.

Jodie is called back to New York by her law firm to handle the Stone deal, but ends up being captured  by Allen along with another private investigator posing as the Stone's lawyer, forcing Reacher to come to her rescue. Reacher manages to kill Allen and his men, but sustains a seemingly fatal bullet wound to his chest. At the hospital, however, a doctor discovers that, due to the arduous physical labour he has done digging pools in Key West, his pectoral muscle was so thick the bullet did not make it past his rib cage. Reacher is then visited (while convalescing) by the Hobie family to thank him for restoring their son's good name.

Accomplices
Jodie Garber-Jacob, 30, is the daughter of General Leon Garber. She met and fell in love with Reacher when she was 15 and was off-limits to him. In Tripwire, she is divorced, using her married name, working as a corporate attorney and reunites romantically with him after her father's funeral. She and Reacher lived together in New York City and upstate New York in Leon's house which was left in his will to Reacher, his surrogate son. She is mentioned in Echo Burning as having moved to Europe. She appears in Tripwire, and The Visitor (Running Blind in the United States).

Continuation
The bullet wound that Reacher received is mentioned a few times in other Lee Child novels.
Most of the women that Reacher sleeps with notice the "crater" and usually place their pinkie there while asking how it happened. 
In One Shot Reacher sums up the story by saying it was a wound received by a "Mad Man" and that most women are curious about it except for the one whom he was saving at the time.

Production
Lee Child began writing Tripwire in spring 1997. The book was published on 15 June 1999 in the United Kingdom and the American publication followed on 28 June of the same year.

The reasoning for the opening of the book taking place in Key West was a vacation Child spent there in 1996.

The provisional title for Tripwire was The Hook, but that name was scrapped as Putnam believed the title was not "punchy" enough. Putnam also believed The Hook would remind people too much of Peter Pan.

Reception
Tripwire received positive reviews from critics, with The Orlando Sentinel calling it "a thriller good to the last drop" and The Arizona Daily Star saying "Lee Child can write. [...] Child grabs hold with the first page and won't let go until the finish. This is pulse-pounding suspense, and Child hardly misses a beat." The book was also praised by fellow authors, with Michael Connelly saying "It's a tightly-drawn and swift thriller that gives new meaning to what a page-turner should be." Stephen White also commented, calling Tripwire a "stylish thriller."

References

External links
 Tripwire information page on Lee Child's official website.

1999 British novels
1999 American novels
Jack Reacher books
Novels set in Florida
Bantam Press books
Third-person narrative novels
G. P. Putnam's Sons books